Dioctophyme is a monotypic genus of nematodes belonging to the family Dioctophymidae. The only species is Dioctophyme renale.

The species is found in Northern America and Japan.

References

Nematodes
Nematode genera
Monotypic animal genera